Riceboro is a city in Liberty County, Georgia, United States. The population was 809 at the 2010 census. It is a part of the Hinesville-Fort Stewart metropolitan statistical area.

History
The community was named for the early rice industry in the area. Riceboro served as the second seat of Liberty County from 1789 until 1837.

The Georgia General Assembly first incorporated the place as the "Village of Riceborough" in 1819.

Geography

Riceboro is located at  (31.735411, -81.440240).

Demographics

2020 census

As of the 2020 United States census, there were 615 people, 310 households, and 193 families residing in the city.

2010 census
As of the 2010 United States Census, there were 809 people living in the city. The racial makeup of the city was 90.6% Black, 5.9% White, 0.1% Asian, 0.1% Pacific Islander and 1.6% from two or more races. 1.6% were Hispanic or Latino of any race.

2000 census
As of the census of 2000, there were 736 people, 256 households, and 190 families living in the city. The racial makeup of the city was 10.33% White and 88.72% African American.

There were 256 households, out of which 32.4% had children under the age of 18 living with them, 46.5% were married couples living together, 21.1% had a female householder with no husband present, and 25.4% were non-families. 23.8% of all households were made up of individuals, and 12.1% had someone living alone who was 65 years of age or older. The average household size was 2.88 and the average family size was 3.42.

In the city, the population was spread out, with 29.9% under the age of 18, 8.3% from 18 to 24, 25.3% from 25 to 44, 22.0% from 45 to 64, and 14.5% who were 65 years of age or older. The median age was 36 years. For every 100 females, there were 98.9 males.  For every 100 females age 18 and over, there were 91.1 males.

The median income for a household in the city was $31,406, and the median income for a family was $40,938. Males had a median income of $31,635 versus $17,250 for females. The per capita income for the city was $15,235.  About 15.5% of families and 19.2% of the population were below the poverty line, including 20.6% of those under age 18 and 32.1% of those age 65 or over.

Notable people
DeLisha Milton-Jones, WNBA player and Olympic gold medalist, head coach at Pepperdine University
Richard LeCounte III, (b 1998) NFL safety for the Cleveland Browns and at the University of Georgia

See also
List of county seats in Georgia (U.S. state)

References

External links
Georgia's Coast in photographs and more

Cities in Georgia (U.S. state)
Cities in Liberty County, Georgia
Hinesville metropolitan area
Former county seats in Georgia (U.S. state)